Questia was an online commercial digital repository of books and articles that had an academic orientation, with a particular emphasis on books and journal articles in the humanities and social sciences. All the text in all the Questia books and articles were available to subscribers; the site also included integrated research tools. As of December 21, 2020, it ceased operations.

Company history
Questia, based in Chicago, Illinois, was founded in 1998 and purchased by Gale, part of Cengage Learning, in January 2010.

Service
Questia offered some information free of charge, including several public domain works, publication information, tables of contents, the first page of every chapter, Boolean searches of the contents of the library, and short bibliographies of available books and articles on some 6500 topics.

Questia did not sell ownership to books or ebooks, but rather sold monthly or annual subscriptions that allowed temporary online reading access to all 94000+ books, and 14 million + journal, magazine, and newspaper articles in their collection.  The books were selected by academic librarians as credible, authoritative works in their respective areas. The librarians also compiled about 7000 reference bibliographies on frequently researched topics. The library was strongest in books and journal articles in the social sciences and humanities, with many older historical texts. Original pagination was maintained. The Questia service also featured tools to automatically create citations and bibliographies, helping writers to properly cite the materials.

A limitation to the Questia library was that new additions were available in a "beta" version only. Unlike Questia's earlier publications, these prevented users from copying text directly from the website, although one page from the publications could be printed free of charge. A charge was made for printing a range of pages.

Questia launched their Q&A blog on September 21, 2011. Q&A was divided into "Education news," "Student resources" and "Subjects" categories. "Subjects" was further broken down so readers could find specific content based on their academic needs.

Questia released an iPhone app in 2011, which was extended to the iPad the following year. Then in January 2013 Questia launched tutorials, including videos and quizzes, to teach students the research process.

Criticism
Questia was criticized in 2005 by librarian Steven J. Bell for referring to itself as an academic library, when it concentrated on the liberal arts and treated users as customers rather than students. Moreover, Bell argued, Questia did not employ academic librarians or faculty. Although some of its employees had advanced library degrees, they did not work or collaborate with faculty to develop collections that served distinctive student populations.

On November 24, 2020, Cengage sent email to Questia's subscribers – including those who had bought a lifetime subscription before Cengage purchased Questia – to the effect that Cengage would be closing down Questia as of December 21, 2020, thus nullifying all subscription contracts while continuing to offer the same sort of service directly through Cengage.

Questia followed Highbeam Research in exiting Wikipedia's program to enable editors free access to paywalled research websites and electronic publications. Source links to Questia's library material on Wikipedia become unreachable when Questia's parent shut down Questia in 2021.

See also 
 List of digital library projects
 List of academic databases and search engines

References

External links 
 

Internet properties established in 1998
Commercial digital libraries
Full-text scholarly online databases
1998 establishments in Illinois
American digital libraries
Internet properties disestablished in 2020
2020 disestablishments in Illinois